Bala is a town and district of Ankara Province in the Central Anatolia region of Turkey, 67 km south-east of the city of Ankara. According to 2000 census, population of the district is 19,426 of which 8,506 live in the urban center of Bala.

Bala stands on a high plain, summers are hot, winters are cold and snowy. The town of Bala is small but busy with shops and light manufacturing workshops, the surrounding countryside is used for farming, especially grains and sunflower seeds. Recently Ankara's wealthier citizens have begun building luxury housing in some villages of Bala. However the town stands on a fault line and experiences many earthquakes.

Places of interest
The forest of Beynam and the Kesikköprü reservoir are two of Ankara's most popular picnic spots.

Settlements in the district

Towns
 Afşar
 Bala

Neighborhoods

Abazlı  
Ahmetçayırı  
Akarlar  
Akörençarşak  
Aydoğan  
Aşağıhacıbekir 
Aşıkoğlu  
Bahçekaradalak  
Bağiçi
Bektaşlı
Belçarsak  
Beynam  
Buyukdavdanlı
Büyükboyalık  
Büyükbıyık
Büyükcamili
Davdanlı  
Derekışla  
Erdemli 
Ergin  
Evciler  
Eğribasan  
Gülbağı  
Hanburun 
Karahamzalı  
Keklicek  
Kerişli  
Kesikköprü
Koçyayla  
Kömürcü  
Köseli  
Küçükbayat
Küçükboyalık  
Küçükbıyık  
Küçükcamili
Sarıhüyük
Sofular  
Suyugüzel  
Sırapınar  
Tatarhüyük  
Tepeköy  
Tolköy 
Yaylaköy
Yaylalıözü
Yeniköy 
Yeniyapançarşak  
Yeniyapanşeyhli  
Yukarıhacıbekir  
Yöreli  
Çatalçeşme  
Çatalören  
Çiğdemli  
Üçem  
Şehriban

Notes

References

External links

 District governor's official website 
 District municipality's official website 

 
Populated places in Ankara Province
Districts of Ankara Province